Kinondoni Municipal Council Football Club, locally known as KMC, is a Tanzanian football club based in Kinondoni District in Dar es Salaam. The club's home games are played at the National Stadium. It is among of six teams qualified  to the Vodacom Premier League in 2018 Tanzanian football, their archrivals being Simba and Yanga.

Players
Salimu Khamis Aiyee, (2019- )

References

Football clubs in Tanzania
Works association football clubs in Tanzania